"End of an Era" is an American comic book story arc that was published by DC Comics, and presented in Legion of Super-Heroes vol. 4, #60-61, Legionnaires #17-18, and Valor #22-23 (August–September 1994). It was written by Mark Waid, Tom McCraw and Kurt Busiek, with pencils by Stuart Immonen, Ron Boyd, Chris Gardner and Colleen Doran. A tie-in to the Zero Hour: Crisis in Time miniseries, it is the final story arc in the Legion of Super-Heroes' original timeline, and marks the end of 36 years of unbroken Legion continuity.

Plot

Part 1: Legionnaires #17
High above New Earth, the teenage Legionnaires from Batch SW6 prevent a mysterious being from destroying the domed cities. They are shocked to learn that the man is a disoriented Rokk Krinn, Cosmic Boy from the adult version of the Legion of Super-Heroes. Soon, they all travel to the cemetery planet Shanghalla after hearing about the recent death of Laurel Gand in the latest war with the Khundian Empire. The SW6 Invisible Kid and the two versions of Brainiac 5 interrupt the funeral to inform them that the timestream has become fractured, and that an unknown force has been shifting reality for years — since the SW6 Legionnaires entered time-stasis. While being attacked by various villains from different alternate timelines, members from the dual Legions are confronted by their two greatest enemies: Mordru and Glorith. The couple disappears with Rokk Krin. Dawnstar is about to begin tracking them, but she unexpectedly fades from existence.

Part 2: Valor #22
The structural core connecting the domed cities of New Earth is on the verge of total collapse, and a second faction from the two Legions tries desperately to hold the artificial planet together. Valor struggles to remember the major details of his life, as portions of his memory keep shifting. Legion benefactor R. J. Brande devises a plan to bring the Earth from the pocket universe into the regular universe, and settle the domes of New Earth there. Computo (Danielle Foccart) and Troy Stewart (the former Tyroc) use their respective powers to open a gigantic wormhole, permitting Valor, the SW6 Andromeda and Dev-Em to tow Earth from the pocket universe to the regular one. However, a matter-energy shift occurs, making the entire planetary core unstable and likely to explode. Before the group can take additional action, more Legionnaires fade from existence.

Part 3: Legion of Super-Heroes vol. 4, #60
Mordru and Glorith imprison Rokk Krin in the Castle Keep of Time on the planet Baaldur. They do not kill him, as Glorith has determined that he is a "child of destiny", and that killing him would unleash chaos throughout the timestream. Meanwhile, almost all the living past and present members of both Legions (except those on New Earth) gather on Winath to begin a search for Rokk, who is considered to be the heart of the Legion. Even as more Legionnaires vanish, Rond Vidar, the SW6 Invisible Kid and the two Brainiac 5s determine that the timestream is completely unraveling, and must be repaired within hours. Mordru and Glorith travel to Legion Headquarters on the planet Talus, and reach the team's Time Beacon. They use it to summon the Infinite Man, who is the living embodiment of the space-time continuum. Mordru and Glorith immediately attack, allowing them to absorb all of the Infinite Man's energies and dissolve him into nothingness. Meanwhile, on Baaldur, Rokk cannot escape the castle, but is able to flee into the Infinite Library, the archive of all chronal knowledge.

Part 4: Legionnaires #18
Now possessing near-godlike power, Mordru and Glorith begin to remold reality, with themselves as supreme rulers of the known universe. The Legionnaires with mystical knowledge and powers (Mysa Nal, Projectra, Dragonmage and the two Dream Girls) begin channeling their energies into Devlin O'Ryan, who would then become a living power blast able to stop Mordru and Glorith. Just as they are ready to act, Devlin fades away, leaving the mystics with no focus for their magic. With more of their number vanishing each minute, the heroes fend off attacks by a group of evil doppelganger Legionnaires. Just before Mysa (the former White Witch) disappears, she calls upon the power of Amethyst and manages to reverse Mordru and Glorith's changes to the timeline.

In the 20th century, the founding SW6 Legionnaires (Cosmic Boy, Saturn Girl and Live Wire) emerge from a shattered Time Bubble high above the Earth. They are about to fall to their deaths when they are saved by Jo Nah, the former Ultra Boy. An image of Superman then appears before them, seeking their aid to avert a great disaster. In the Infinite Library — where time stands still — Rokk Krinn spends an untold length of time studying the volumes on the shelves, learning as much as possible about the secrets of time. Eventually, he notices a door that is slightly ajar. He walks through, and finds himself face-to-face with the Time Trapper.

Part 5: Valor #23
The Time Trapper tells Rokk that — despite his many battles with the Legion — he has actually been attempting to save the 30th century all along from an impending cataclysm in time. As part of the plan, he used his power to split the Legion into two separate time tracks just before Ferro Lad's death, placing one group in time-stasis to be discovered later as the SW6 Legionnaires. Eventually, the Trapper's attempts to protect time drove him mad, and created revisions to the timeline that allowed Mordru and Glorith to become galactic threats. Rokk, the Trapper explains, is the key to repairing everything. Rokk does not believe the Trapper... until he reveals his true face.

The Legionnaires gain much-needed assistance when Superboy, the very inspiration for the team, suddenly appears. When Valor momentarily distracts Glorith, Superboy knocks her unconscious. The team then bathes Mordru in all of the floating chronal energy, overloading him and permitting Imra Ardeen Ranzz (the former Saturn Girl) to command him to teleport to the core of the planet — where his claustrophobic fear of being buried underground will render him powerless. Mordru chooses the unstable pocket universe Earth. Valor then fades away, and — after an inspirational speech — so does Superboy.

Part 6: Legion of Super-Heroes vol. 4, #61
The remaining Legionnaires gather on Pocket Earth, where Jo Nah and the SW6 founders return from the 20th century. Rokk Krinn is then returned to the group by the Time Trapper, who reveals himself to be an older version of Rokk. The Legion listens as the two explain that Rokk was destined to become the Time Trapper and attempt in vain to prevent the catastrophe in time, and that the creation of the second Legion team has further weakened the timestream. Only the reunification of the adult Legion with their young SW6 counterparts can realign time. As a final gift, the Trapper reaches into time and restores the two versions of Tinya Wazzo, allowing Jo Nah to finally reunite with Phantom Girl. Most of the remaining Legionnaires reunite and fade into the timestream, leaving only the dual versions of the founders. Before departing, the Trapper assures them that their sacrifice will not be in vain. Pocket Earth begins to break apart, and the six Legionnaires — the last remaining sentient beings in the cosmos — join hands as all reality disappears, fading into a white void.

Aftermath
"End of an Era" is a tie-in to the Zero Hour: Crisis in Time miniseries, which attempted to resolve some of the inconsistencies in the timeline of the DC Universe. Thereafter, Legion continuity is completely rebooted, starting in Legion of Super-Heroes vol. 4, #0 (October 1994). Subsequently, a second reboot occurs in the final pages of Teen Titans/Legion Special (November 2004).

Following the Infinite Crisis miniseries, much of the original Legion continuity is restored. However, "End of an Era" is not, and the story arc is no longer considered canonical.

In his current incarnation, the Time Trapper is not Rokk Krinn, and his identity shifts with each divergent timeline. He remains one of the Legion's principal enemies, with the complete removal of Superman from the timestream as one of his chief goals. Glorith, who originally appeared as one of the Trapper's underlings, is described by Mordru as one of "those that died by pain and torture by my hand!" Mordru reanimates her skeleton during a battle with the Legion, but the heroes promptly destroy it.

See also
Zero Hour: Crisis in Time

References

Comics by Kurt Busiek
Comics by Mark Waid
Legion of Super-Heroes storylines